was a Japanese actress. She appeared in more than 150 films between 1935 and 1973 under the direction of filmmakers like Kenji Mizoguchi, Yasujirō Ozu and Kaneto Shindō.

Selected filmography

 Wakadanna haru ranman (1935) – Girl student
 Sendō kawaiya (1935)
 Mr. Thank You (1936)
 Hanayome karuta (1937) – Emako
 Kōjō no tsuki (1937) – Keiko
 Okusama ni shirasu bekarazu (1937) – Ohatsu
 Koi mo wasurete (1937) – Woman at hotel
 Suigō jōka – Kojō no reikon (1937) – Machiko
 Hanagata senshu (1937) – Girl at hiking
 Shingun no uta (1937)
 Haha to ko (1938)
 Aizen katsura (1938) – Kimura's Wife / Kimura's child
 Minamikaze (1939) – Keiko Kita
 Imōto no haregi (1939) – Kiyoko Sudō
 Zoku aizen katsura (1939) – Kimura's wife / Kimura's child
 Shin josei mondo (1939)
 Kuwa no mi wa akai (1939)
 Aizen katsura – Kanketsu-hen (1939) – Kimura's wife / Kimura's child
 Danryũ Part 1 and 2 (1939) – Gin Ishiwata
 Aizen tsubaki (1940)
 Kinuyo no hatsukoi (1940) – Onobu
 Hana wa itsuwarazu (1941) – Sumiko
 Sakura no kuni (1941)
 Soshu no yoru (1941)
 There Was a Father (1942) – Fumiko Hirata
  (1942)
 Minami no kaze mizue no maki (1942)
 Hana saku minato (1943) – O-haru
 Hiwa Normanton jiken: Kamen no butō (1943) – Chie, Jun'nosuke's sister
 Kaigun (1943)
 Fuchinkan gekichin (1944)
 Suihei-san (1944)
 Kanko no machi (1944)
 Gekiryu (1944)
 Kimi koso tsugi no arawashi da (1944)
 Omitsu no endan (1946) – Omitsu
 Jōen (1947)
 Onnadake no yoru (1947)
 Onna (1948) – Toshiko
 Ōshō (1948) – Koharu
 Korosu ga gotoku (1948)
 Flame of My Love (1949) – Chiyo
 Watashi no na wa jofu (1949)
 Senka no hate (1950)
 Ai to nikushimi no kanata e (1951)
 Joshu Garasu (1951)
 Meigetsu somato (1951)
 Hibari no komoriuta (1951)
 The Tale of Genji (1951) – Aoi no ue
 Avalanche (1952) – Tokie Kijima
 Dedication of the Great Buddha (1952) – Sakuyako Tachibana
  (1952) – Asako Shimamura
 Ushiwakamaru (1952) – Tokiwa
  (1952)
 (1952)
 Ugetsu (1953) – Ohama
 Yokubo (1953) – Sakie Kajiwara
 Tange Sazen (1953) – Ofuji
 Zoku Tange Sazen (1953) – Ofuji
 Konjiki yasha (1954) – Akagashi
 An Inn at Osaka (1954)
 Samurai I: Musashi Miyamoto (1954) – Oko, Matahachi's wife
 Shiode Kushima Binan Kenpo (1954)
 Shinsengumi Oni Taicho (1954)
 Onikiri wakasama (1955)
 Wataridori itsu kaeru (1955) – Chiyoko
 Samurai II: Duel at Ichijoji Temple (1955) – Oko, Akemi's mother
 Mune yori mune ni (1955) – Yuko Uemura
 Shin shokoku mongatari: Otena no tō – Zempen (1955) – Yũzomeni
 Samurai III: Duel at Ganryu Island (1955) – Oko
 Shin shokoku mongatari: Otena no tō – Kōhen (1956) – Yũzomeni
 Gogo 8 ji 13 pun (1956) – Mitsue Kashimura
 Anata kaimasu (1956)
 The Treasure of Gen. Yamashita (1956)
 Akuma no kao (1957) – Hama Kojima
 Morishige no Boku wa biyōshi (1957) – Chiyono
 Kuroi kafun (1958) – Okin
 Sorrow is Only for Women (1958) – Harue
 Ukiyo buro (1958) – O-riku
 Hana no yukyo-den (1958)
 Mayonaka no kao (1958)
 Haru o matsu hitobito (1959)
 Ballad of the Cart (1959) – Natsuno
 Hashi (1959) – Okiku
 Bōfũken (1959) – Shizue Tashiro
 Ningen no kabe (1959)
 The Wandering Princess (1960) – Izumi
 Arashi o yobu gakudan (1960) – Yukie Maki
 Koi ni inochi o (1961) – Teruyo Fuji
 Shin Genji monogatari (1961)
 Tsuma ari ko ari tomo arite (1961) – Takiyo Sugawa
  (1962)
 Onnakeizu (1962) – Mrs. Kono
 Yatchaba no onna (1962)
 Gan (1966) – Osan
 Ohana han Part 1 and 2 (1966) – Teru Asao
 Daraku suru onna (1967) – Makiko
 Gekiryu (1967) – Chito Asuka
 Rikugun chōhō 33 (1968) – Tamiko Yamamoto
 Senso to ningen: Unmei no jokyoku (1970) – Otaki
 Senso to ningen II: Ai to kanashimino sanga (1971) – Otaki
 Senso to ningen III: Kanketsuhen (1973) – Taki

References

External links
 
 

1919 births
1981 deaths
Japanese film actresses
Actors from Fukushima Prefecture
20th-century Japanese actresses